Tedd L. Mitchell (born February 24, 1962) is the fifth and current Chancellor of Texas Tech University System, a $2.5 billion state university system with an annual enrollment of approximately 63,000 students across five separate universities - Texas Tech University, Texas Tech University Health Sciences Center, Angelo State University, Texas Tech University Health Sciences Center El Paso and Midwestern State University - and located on 24 academic locations statewide and international. A doctor of medicine, Mitchell is also a published author and chairman for the Board of Trustees for the Cooper Institute., a Dallas-based health and wellness system founded by Dr. Kenneth H. Cooper

Early life and career 

Tedd L. Mitchell, M.D., was born in Columbia, Louisiana and raised in Longview, Texas. He earned a Bachelor of Science degree in Biology from Stephen F. Austin State University and a Doctor of Medicine degree in 1987 from the University of Texas Medical Branch, where he is an Ashbel Smith Distinguished Alumnus.

Following an elective rotation at the Cooper Clinic in Dallas, Mitchell earned a certificate of added qualification in Sports Medicine. In 1991, he was appointed medical director at the Cooper Clinic, a role he held until being named president and chief executive officer in 2006. From 2002 to 2008, he was appointed to President George W. Bush’s President's Council on Physical Fitness and Sports. In 2007, he was named to the College Sports Medicine Board of Trustees. He also served on Texas Governor George Bush’s State Board on Aging (1998 – 2002).

Mitchell also served as a captain of the U.S. Army Reserves Medical Corps from 1996 to 1998. He is a Fellow of the American College of Physicians and the American College of Sports Medicine.

Career with Texas Tech University System 
In 2010, Mitchell began his career in academic administration joining the Texas Tech University System as president of Texas Tech University Health Sciences Center. During his tenure, Texas Tech University Health Sciences Center El Paso was established as a standalone institution in 2013 (the TTU System's fourth university), the Texas Tech University Health Sciences Center University Center in Lubbock was expanded, and a new 51,000 square foot Academic Classroom Building was added on the TTUHSC Odessa Campus. In 2019, Texas Tech University Health Sciences Center's achieved record enrollment to become the top Texas health-related academic institution based on number of health care professional graduates.

On October 25, 2018, the Texas Tech University System Board of Regents named Mitchell the fifth chancellor of the TTU System. Following the appointment, he served the dual role of TTU System chancellor and TTUHSC president for approximately one year until on Nov. 1, 2019, TTUHSC provost and chief academic officer Lori Rice-Spearman was named interim TTUHSC president.

In 2019, a delegation led by Mitchell urged the 86th Texas Legislature to approve and fund a new Texas Tech University veterinary school in Amarillo (Texas's first new veterinary school since 1916), and a new dental school at Texas Tech University Health Sciences Center El Paso (the state's first since 1971).

Personal life 
Mitchell is married to Dr. Janet Tornelli-Mitchell, whom he met while at medical school. They reside in Lubbock, Texas and have three grown children: Katherine; Charlie; and Chris.

Honors, affiliations, and awards 

 The Honor Society of Phi Kappa Phi, member, 2017.
 The University of Texas Medical Branch, Ashbel Smith Distinguished Alumnus Award, 2014.
 American Medical Writers Association, Walter C. Alvarez Award for Excellence in Medical Communication, 2008.
 Clarion Award, National Informational Column (HealthSmart), USA Weekend, 2006.

Public and community service 

Chair, March of Dimes – March for Babies, Annual Fundraiser for March of Dimes, Lubbock, Texas, 2018.
 Tedd's Rx” – Syndicated weekly television health series, West Texas and New Mexico, 2012 – 2016.
 KCBD Lubbock (NBC television affiliate).  “The President’s Prescription” - weekly television health series (Sunday nights at 10 PM), 2011 – Present.
 Chairman, Board of Trustees, Cooper Institute for Aerobics Research, 2011–Present.
 Lubbock Impact Free Medical Clinic, Volunteer faculty physician, 2010 – Present.
 American College of Sports Medicine “Exercise is Medicine" Task Force, 2007 – 2013.
 Texas State Board of Aging (Texas Gubernatorial Appointment), 1998 – 2002.

Publications/research ("Scientific Writing") 

 Mitchell TL, Barlow CE, “Review of the Role of Exercise in Improving Quality of Life in Healthy Individuals and in Those with Chronic Diseases,” Current Sports Medicine Reports.  July 2011, Vol. 10 (4); pp 211–216.
 Mitchell, T. L., L. W. Gibbons, S. M. Devers, and C. P. Earnest. "Effects of Cardiorespiratory Fitness on Healthcare Utilization," Medicine & Science in Sports & Exercise. Vol. 36, No. 12, pp. 2088–2092, 2004.
 Mitchell T., Pippin J., Devers S., Kimball T., Cannaday J., Gibbons L., Cooper K., “Age and sex based nomograms from coronary artery calcium scores as determined by electron beam computed tomography,” American Journal of Cardiology.  Feb. 15,2001; 87(4); p 453-6, A6.
 Gibbons L., Mitchell T., Wei M., Blair S., Cooper K., “The maximal exercise test as a predictor of risk for coronary heart disease mortality in asymptomatic men,” American Journal of Cardiology. 2000; 86:53-58.
 Neck C., Mitchell T., Manz C, Cooper K., Thompson E., “Fit to lead: is fitness the key to effective executive leadership?”  Journal of Managerial Psychology, 2000; 15 (8): 833-340.
 Wei M., Gibbons L., Mitchell T., Kampert J., Stern M., Blair S., “Low fasting plasma glucose level as a predictor of cardiovascular disease and all-cause mortality,” Circulation, 2000; 101:2047-2052.

References 

1962 births
Living people
Chancellors of the Texas Tech University System
Stephen F. Austin State University alumni
University of Texas Medical Branch alumni
American health care chief executives
Presidents of the Texas Tech University Health Sciences Center